Shelia P. Moses,  is an African-American writer whose subjects include comedian Dick Gregory and The Legend of Buddy Bush.  
In 2004, she was nominated for the National Book Award and named the Coretta Scott King Honoree for "The Legend of Buddy Bush"
In 2009, her novel "Joseph" was nominated for the NAACP Image Award.

Life
Moses was born in the small, rural, northeastern North Carolina town of Rich Square.
She grew up ninth in a family of ten children; she received her bachelor's degree in Psychology from Shaw University.

Bibliography
Callus on My Soul: a memoir, by Dick Gregory with Shelia P. Moses, 2000, 
Sallie Gal and the Wall-a-kee man, 2007, 
The Legend of Buddy Bush, 2004, ;  (Coretta Scott King Award honor book)
 
I, Dred Scott, 2005, 
The Baptism, 2007,

References

External links

Brief bio at Library of Congress 2007 National Book Festival

Year of birth missing (living people)
Living people
People from Rich Square, North Carolina
American children's writers
African-American women writers
American biographers
Shaw University alumni
Writers from North Carolina
American women children's writers
American women biographers
African-American writers